Nam District (Nam-gu) is a district in central Daegu, South Korea. It borders Dalseong-gun to the south, Dalseo-gu to the west, Seo-gu to the northwest, Jung-gu to the north, and Suseong-gu to the east. Hyupsung High School and USFK Camp Walker is located in the area. In contains Kyungbok Middle School.

References

External links

Official website 

 
Districts of Daegu